Pinky is the title character of an Italian humorous comic series created by Massimo Mattioli.

Background
The comics debuted in the children magazine Il Giornalino in October 1973 and through the years Pinky became the most loved character and the mascot of the magazine. The series features a small eccentric pink bunny named Pinky, who works as a photojournalist for a newspaper ("La notizia") run by a vain, tyrannical and selfish elephant named Perry. Its mission is to photograph any strange event or bizarre citizen.

References
 

1973 comics debuts
Italian comic strips
Italian comics titles
Italian comics characters
Humor comics
Magazine mascots
Male characters in comics
Male characters in advertising
Comics about rabbits and hares
Mascots introduced in 1973
Comics characters introduced in 1973